Get Real is a 1998 British romantic comedy-drama film directed by Simon Shore, based on the play What's Wrong with Angry? by screenwriter Patrick Wilde. The plot centres the coming of age of a gay teen while growing up in rural Britain during the Cool Britannia era of the late 1990s. The film was shot and set in and around Basingstoke, England. Get Real has since become a cult classic among fans of queer cinema.

Plot
Steven Carter (Ben Silverstone) is a 16-year-old middle-class schoolboy who is intelligent and good-looking, but un-athletic and introverted. Bullied at school and misunderstood at home, his only confidante is his neighbour and best friend, Linda (Charlotte Brittain). Keeping his sexual orientation hidden from everyone else, he cruises in public toilets. He is surprised to find the school jock, John Dixon (Brad Gorton) also cruising, but John denies that he is gay.

At a school dance, Steven gains a friend after he comforts Jessica (Stacy Hart), following her argument with her boyfriend, Kevin (Tim Harris), who is also his bully. When he returns home, John follows him and confides about his own sexual orientation. They start a relationship.

Word around the school spreads about someone being gay, and John fears that Steven has been telling people. In order to maintain his status, John beats up Steven in front of his friends. Steven announces in front of assembly that he is gay, and looks to John for support, who ignores him. John apologizes for beating him up and says he loves him, but as he is too afraid to come out, Steven breaks up with him, wishing him happiness.

Cast
 Ben Silverstone as Steven Carter
 Brad Gorton as John Dixon
 Charlotte Brittain as Linda
 Jacquetta May as Steven's Mother
 David Lumsden as Steven's Father
 Richard Hawley as English Teacher
 Martin Milman as Headmaster
 Stacy Hart as Jessica
 Kate McEnery as Wendy
 Patrick Nielsen as Mark
 Tim Harris as Kevin Grainger
 James D. White as Dave
 James Perkins as Young Steve
 Nicholas Hunter as Young Mark
 Steven Mason as Cruising Man
 Morgan Jones as Linda's Brother
 Ian Brimble as John's Father
 Judy Buxton as John's Mother
 David Elliot as Glen
 Charlotte Hanson as Glen's Wife
 Louise J. Taylor as Christina Lindmann
 Steven Elder as Bob the Driving Instructor
 Leonie Thomas as Aunt at Wedding
 David Paul West as Bridegroom
 Andy Rashleigh as Policeman

Production
Get Real was filmed in and around Basingstoke from the 17th August 1997, before moving on to the Millenium Studios in Borehamwood on the 22nd September. (The scenes shot in the studio were Steven’s bedroom and the inside of the public toilet). The entire movie took six weeks to shoot.

Reception
The film ranked number 34 on Entertainment Weekly'''s list of the 50 Best High School Movies.

The film was well received by many critics, and subsequently nominated for eight awards, and won six.

In the Seattle Post-Intelligencer, Paula Nechak praised the film for allowing the characters to be themselves rather than change to fit in, and praises the treatment of the 'jock' character John as being just as bound by the school popularity game as Steven.

Roger Ebert commented "Certainly this film has deeper values than the mainstream teenage comedies that retail aggressive materialism, soft-core sex and shallow ideas about "popularity." Steven Holden from The New York Times wrote "The movie captures the excruciating paranoia of a situation in which there’s nowhere the lovers can be alone except in each other’s homes on the rare occasions their parents are out."

In the Daily Record, Siobhan Synnot criticised the film as being like a "preachy episode of Grange Hill'' with cardboard cut-out characters" and also criticised the John character for being unbelievable, describing him as "simply a bland fantasy hunk. It's hard to see how this dim bulb is bright enough for Oxford, because all the smart lines go to his smart-alec boyfriend."

References

External links

 
 
 

1998 films
1998 LGBT-related films
1998 comedy-drama films
1998 romantic comedy films
1998 romantic drama films
1990s buddy comedy-drama films
1990s coming-of-age comedy-drama films
1990s English-language films
1990s high school films
1998 romantic comedy-drama films
1990s teen comedy-drama films
1990s teen romance films
British buddy comedy-drama films
British coming-of-age comedy-drama films
British films based on plays
British high school films
British romantic comedy-drama films
British teen comedy-drama films
British teen LGBT-related films
British teen romance films
Coming-of-age romance films
Films shot in Hampshire
Gay-related films
LGBT-related buddy comedy-drama films
LGBT-related coming-of-age films
LGBT-related romantic comedy-drama films
British LGBT-related films
Films directed by Simon Shore
1990s British films